René Felix (born 23 June 1990) is an Austrian footballer.

References

Austrian footballers
Austrian Football Bundesliga players
SC Wiener Neustadt players
FC Lustenau players
1990 births
Living people
Footballers from Vienna
Association football forwards